Chijire Glacier is a glacier flowing to the coast just east of Chijire Rocks in Queen Maud Land. It was mapped from surveys and air photos by the Japanese Antarctic Research Expedition, 1957–62, who also named it.

See also
 List of glaciers in the Antarctic
 Glaciology

References

 

Glaciers of Queen Maud Land
Prince Olav Coast